Freedom Collection is a digital repository sponsored by the George W. Bush Institute at the George W. Bush Presidential Center on Southern Methodist University's campus in Dallas, Texas. The collection documents major players in human rights and freedom movements around the world during the 20th and 21st centuries through video interviews and documents. Contributors include former president of Liberia Ellen Johnson Sirleaf, Syrian dissident and author Ammar Abdulhamid, former president of Czechoslovakia and the Czech Republic Václav Havel, Chinese civil rights activist Chen Guangcheng, former president of Peru Alejandro Toledo, and Egyptian author Saad Eddin Ibrahim. At its launch on March 28, 2012, the collection consisted of 56 interviews. As of 2022, the Freedom Collection website was last updated in 2016 and its YouTube channel, where video interviews are available to watch, was last updated in October 2015. It is unclear if the project is still active.

Physical collection
The Freedom Collection is housed at the Bush Presidential Center in Dallas and displays several important documents and items from human rights movements. The first gift was an early draft of the 1963 Tibetan Constitution from the Dalai Lama and features handwritten notes in the margins. In 2018, Bob Fu donated a bible handwritten by "members of house churches in China while they were prisoners in Chinese labor camps." The Lawton Foundation donated the Presidential Medal of Freedom awarded to Cuban activist Óscar Elías Biscet in 2007 to display until Biscet was released from political prison in Cuba. Biscet collected the medal in 2016. In 2014, the Collection produced the short documentary Freedom Denied: Cuba's Black Spring Continues. The following year, the archive was used to supplement high school curricula focused on "global struggles for liberty" written by the Bush Presidential Center.

Interviews
As of 2022, the online collection has 95 video interviews, which can be organized by region:

The Americas

Greater Middle East

Sub-Saharan Africa

Asia

Europe

References

2012 establishments in the United States
Archives in the United States
Southern Methodist University